Franco-Belgian comics, together with American and British comic books and Japanese manga, are one of the three main markets. The term is broad, and can be applied to all comics made by French and Belgian comics authors, all comics originally published by French and Belgian comics publishers, or all comics in the styles appearing in the Franco-Belgian comics magazines Tintin and Spirou, possibly expanded to include later magazines like Pilote, Métal Hurlant, and A Suivre. Comics which are not created in French but in Dutch are sometimes included and sometimes excluded from the Franco-Belgian comics.
For this list, a broad definition is taken, including all notable comics series first published by a French or Belgian publisher, no matter what language or nationality the authors have. For series with many different authors (e.g. Spirou & Fantasio), only the most important authors have been included.

See also
List of films based on French-language comics 
List of TV series based on French-language comics

References

Comics
Comics
Franco-Belgian